Loughton is a surname. Notable people with the surname include:

Alex Loughton (born 1983), Australian basketball player
John Loughton (born 1987), Scottish political activist and celebrity TV star
Tim Loughton (born 1962), British Conservative MP since 1997
William Loughton Smith (1758–1812), US lawyer and member of the House of Representatives from 1789 to 1797